Francoeur Baron De Sylvain Kibamba (born 23 March 1998) is a Congolese international footballer who plays for Spanish club Sevilla Atlético as a defender.

Club career
Born in Dolisie, he has played club football for CARA Brazzaville, AS Otôho and Linense.

On 25 June 2019, Kibamba signed for Sevilla FC and was assigned to the reserves.

International career
Kibamba made his international debut for Congo against Senegal in 2017.

References

External links

1998 births
Living people
Republic of the Congo footballers
Association football defenders
CARA Brazzaville players
AS Otôho players
Primera Federación players
Segunda División B players
Real Balompédica Linense footballers
Sevilla Atlético players
Republic of the Congo international footballers
Republic of the Congo expatriate footballers
Republic of the Congo expatriate sportspeople in Spain
Expatriate footballers in Spain
Republic of the Congo A' international footballers
2018 African Nations Championship players